Sancharam may refer to:

 Sancharam (film) or The Journey, a 2004 Indian Malayalam film by Ligy J. Pulleppally
 Sancharam (TV series), an Indian travelogue program